Princess Catherine may refer to:

Catherine Dolgorukov, Princess Yurievskaya (1847–1922), wife of Tsar Alexander II of Russia
Catherine Radziwill (1858–1941), wife of Prince Wilhelm Radziwiłł
Princess Catherine Ivanovna of Russia (1915–2007), daughter of Prince John Constantinovich of Russia
Princess Catherine of Württemberg (1821–1898), daughter of William I of Württemberg
Catherine Hilda Duleep Singh (1871–1942), daughter of Duleep Singh
Catherine, Princess of Asturias (1422–1424), daughter of King John II of Castile
Princess Catherine Dashkova (1743–1810), wife of Prince Mikhail Dashkov
Catherine Yurievskaya (1878–1959), daughter of Alexander II of Russia
Princess Catherine Beatrice of Savoy (1636–1637), daughter of Victor Amadeus I, Duke of Savoy
Catherine of Bosnia (princess) (1453–1???), daughter of King Thomas
Catherine of Sweden, Countess Palatine of Kleeburg (1584–1638), daughter of King Charles IX of Sweden
Catherine Bagration (1783–1857), daughter of Count Pavel Martinovich Skavronsky
Catherine Caradja (1893–1993), daughter of Prince Radu Creţulescu
Catherine Pavlovna of Russia (1788–1819), wife of William I of Württemberg
Catherine of Brandenburg (1604–1649), daughter of John Sigismund, Elector of Brandenburg
Catherine Stenbock (1535–1621), wife of King Gustav I
Catherine, Princess of Wales (born 1982), wife of William, Prince of Wales
Catherine Jagiellon (1526–1583), wife of John III of Sweden
Catherine de Lorraine (1552–1596), daughter of Francis, Duke of Guise
Catherine, Duchess of Braganza (1540–1614), wife of João I, Duke of Braganza
Infanta Catherine, Duchess of Villena (1403–1439), wife of Infante Henry of Aragon
Katherine Tudor (1503–1503), Daughter of Henry VII of England
Catherine of York (1479–1527), daughter of Edward IV of England
Katherine of England (1253–1257), daughter of Henry III of England

See also 
Queen Catherine (disambiguation)

	

Title and name disambiguation pages